Dasari Narayana Rao (4 May 1947 – 30 May 2017) was an Indian film director, producer, screenwriter, actor, lyricist, and politician known for his works predominantly in Telugu cinema, in addition to Hindi cinema. He has directed more than 150 feature films in a variety of genres. He holds the Limca World Record for directing the most number of films in the world. He is known by the moniker Darsaka Ratna. His works emphasize social injustice, corruption and gender discrimination. Narayana Rao has received two National Film Awards, nine state Nandi Awards including the Raghupathi Venkaiah Award, and four Filmfare Awards South including the Lifetime Achievement. During his career he had also acted in Telugu, Tamil, and Kannada films.

Narayana Rao also gained recognition for directing Hindi films such as Swarag Narak (1978), Jyoti Bane Jwala (1980), Pyaasa Sawan (1981), Prem Tapasya (1983), Aaj Ka M.L.A. Ram Avtar (1984), Asha Jyoti (1984), Yaadgaar (1984), Zakhmi Sher (1984), Sarfarosh (1985), Wafadaar (1985). He directed works such as Tandra Paparayudu (1986), and Surigaadu (1992) which were screened at International Film Festival of India in the Panorama section, and Kante Koothurne Kanu (1998) which received the National Film Award Special Mention Feature Film. In 1983, he directed Meghasandesam which screened at the Indian Panorama, the Tashkent Film Festival, and the Moscow film festival. The film also won the National Film Award for Best Feature Film in Telugu.

He was elected to the Rajya Sabha in the year 2006. He became the Minister of state in the Ministry of Coal in the Manmohan Singh government.

Early life
He launched a popular daily newspaper named Udayam to counter the effect of Ramoji Rao's newspaper Eenadu.

Political career
Dasari was elected to the Rajya Sabha in the year 2006. He became the Minister of state in Ministry of Coal. Said to be a confidante of Congress President Sonia Gandhi, Dasari once again became active in politics after Congress Party came back to power in 2004.

On 11 June 2013 Central Bureau of Investigation booked Dasari Narayana Rao for receiving ₹2.25 crores from Naveen Jindal in connection with Coal scam, and filed FIR against both.

Death
Rao died on 30 May 2017 from prolonged illness, at the age of 70. His last rites were performed with full state honours. His funeral was held at his farmhouse in Moinabad village, Ranga Reddy district, where his wife Padma was cremated.

Awards

National Film Awards
Special Jury Award / Special Mention (Feature Film) – Kante Kuthurne Kanu – 1998
National Film Award for Best Feature Film in Telugu – Meghasandesam – 1982 (As director and producer)

Filmfare Awards
Best Director – Gorintaku (1979)
Best Director – Premabhishekam (1981)
Best Film – Meghasandesam (1982)
Lifetime Achievement (2001)

Nandi Awards
NTR National Award
Raghupathi Venkaiah Award - 1990
Best Actor – Mestri (2009)
Best Actor – Mamagaru (1991)
Second Best Feature Film - Silver – Kante Kuthurne Kanu (1998)
Best Director - Kante Koothurne Kanu (1998)
Best Feature Film – Bangaru Kutumbam (1994)
Best Feature Film – Meghasandesam (1982)
Best Feature Film – Swargam Narakam (1975)
Best Feature Film – Samsaram Sagaram (1973)
Best Feature Film – Tata Manavadu (1972)
Best Story -Samsaram Sagaram (1973)
Best Story - Nanna Garu (1994)
Best Story - Kante Kooturne Kanu (1998)
Special Jury – Premabhishekam (1981)
Best Dialogue Writer – M.L.A. Yedukondalu (1983)

CineMAA Awards
Lifetime Contribution – 2003

Other honours
Vamsee Berkeley, Kalasagar, Siromani, Madras Film Fans Awards and Cine Herald Awards
Jyothi Chitra Super Director Award – six times
Ancient Andhra Patrika Best Director Award – six times
Allu Ramalingaiah Memorial Award
Sobhan Babu first memorial award in 2009
Bollimunta Sivaramakrishna Sahithi Kala Award-2016
Doctorate "Kalaprapoorna" from Andhra University for his contribution to Telugu culture and Telugu cinema in 1986

Filmography
Director
Films

 Thatha-Manavadu (1972)
 Samsaram Sagaram (1973)
 Bantrothu Bharya (1974)
 Evariki Vaare Yamuna Teere (1974)
 Radhamma Pelli (1974)
 Tirupati (1974)
 Swargam Narakam (1975)
 Balipeetam (1975)
 Bharatamlo Oka Ammayi (1975)
 Devude Digi Vaste (1975)
 Manushulanta Okkate (1976)
 Muddabanti Puvvu (1976)
 O Manishi Tirigi Choodu (1976)
 Thoorpu Padamara (1976)
 Yavvanam Katesindi (1976)
 Paadavoyi Bharateeyuda (1976)
 Bangarakka (1977)
 Chillarakottu Chittemma (1977)
 Idekkadi Nyayam (1977)
 Jeevitame Oka Natakam (1977)
 Kanya Kumari (1978)
 Devadasu Malli Puttadu (1978)
 Katakatala Rudrayya (1978)
 Sivaranjani (1978)
 Swarag Narak (1978)*
 Gorintaku (1979)
 Kalyani (1979)
 Korikale Gurralayite? (1979)
 Needa (1979)
 Peddillu Chinnillu (1979)
 Ravanude Ramudayithe? (1979)
 Rangoon Rowdy (1979)
 Yeh Kaisa Insaf (1980)*
 Jyoti Bane Jwala (1980)*
 Bandodu Gundamma (1980)
 Bhola Shankarudu (1980)
 Buchi Babu (1980)
 Circus Ramudu (1980)
 Deeparadhana (1980)
 Yedanthasthula Meda (1980)
 Ketugaadu (1980)
 Natchathiram (1980 - Tamil)
 Paalu Neellu (1980)
 Sardar Papa Rayudu (1980)
 Sita Ramulu (1980)
 Srivari Muchatlu (1980)
 Viswaroopam (1981)
 Swapna (1981)
 Pyaasa Sawan (1981)*
 Sangeeta (1981)
 Addala Meda (1981)
 Premabhishekam (1981)
 Prema Mandiram (1981)
 Bobbili Puli (1982)
 Golconda Abbulu (1982)
 Jagannatha Rathachakralu (1982)
 Jayasudha (1982)
 Krishnarjunulu (1982)
 Mehndi Rang Layegi (1982)*
 O Aadadi O Magadu (1982)
 Raaga Deepam (1982)
 Swayamvaram (1982)
 Yuvaraju (1982)
 Prem Tapasya (1983)*
 Bahudoorapu Batasari (1983)
 Meghasandesam (1983)
 M.L.A. Yedukondalu (1983)
 Police Venkataswami (1983)
 Ramudu Kadu Krishnudu (1983)
 Rudrakali (1983)
 Oorantha Sankranthi (1983)
 Aaj Ka M.L.A. Ram Avtar (1984)*
 Asha Jyoti (1984)*
 Haisiyat (1984)*
 Yaadgaar (1984)*
 Zakhmi Sher (1984)*
 Abhimanyudu (1984)
 Jagan (1984)
 Justice Chakravarthy (1984)
 Police Papanna (1984)
 Yuddham (1984)
 Police Paapanna (1984)
 Sarfarosh (1985)*
 Wafadaar (1985)*
 Brahma Mudi (1985)
 Edadugula Bandham (1985)
 Lanchavataram (1985)
 Pelli Meeku Akshintalu Naaku (1985)
 Tirugubatu (1985)
 Aadi Dampatulu (1986)
 Dharma Peetham Daddarillindi (1986)
 Tandra Paparayudu (1986)
 Ugra Narasimham (1986)
 Aatma Bandhuvulu (1987)
 Brahma Nayudu (1987)
 Majnu (1987)
 Nene Raju Nene Mantri (1987)
 Viswanatha Nayakudu (1987)
 Brahma Puthrudu (1988)
 Intinti Bhagavatam (1988)
 Kanchana Sita (1988)
 Praja Pratinidhi (1988)
 Lankeswarudu (1989)
 Black Tiger (1989)
 Naa Mogudu Naake Sontam (1989)
 Two Town Rowdy (1989)
 Abhisarika (1990)
 Amma Rajinama (1991)
 Niyanta (1991)
 Ramudu Kadu Rakshasudu (1991)
 Ahankaari (1992)
 Surigaadu (1992)
 Subba Rayudi Pelli (1992)
 Venkanna Babu (1992)
 Lady Inspector Renuka (1993)
 Santaan (1993)*
 Akka Pettanam Chelleli Kapuram (1993)
 Kunti Putrudu (1993)
 Mama Kodalu (1993)
 Bangaru Kutumbam (1994)
 Nannagaaru (1994) 
 Kondapalli Rattaiah (1995)
 Maya Bazaar (1995) (His 125th film as per advertisement in movie 100 days)
 Orey Rikshaw (1995)
 Kalyana Praptirastu (1996)
 Rayudugaru Nayudugaru (1996)
 Osey Ramulamma (1997)
 Rowdy Durbar (1997)
 Greeku Veerudu (1998)
 Pichodi Chetilo Raayi (1999)
 Adavi Chukka (2000)
 Kante Koothurne Kanu (2000)
 Sammakka Sarakka (2000)
 Chinna (2001)
 Kondaveeti Simhasanam (2002)
 Rifles (2002)
 Fools (2003)
 Young India (2010)
 Parama Veera Chakra (2011)
 Erra Bus (2014) 

(Hindi Films are marked as *)

TV series
 Vishwamitra (1989)Thoorpu Padamara (2007-2010)Abhishekam (2008-2022)Shivaranjani (2010-2011)Kumkuma Rekha (2010-2013)

Actor

 Manavati (1962)
 Swargam Narakam (1975)
 Yavvanam Katesindi (1976)
 Sivaranjani (1978)
 Peddillu Chinnillu (1979)
 Bhola Shankarudu (1980)
 Paalu Neellu (1980)
 Addala Meda (1981)
 Jayasudha (1982)
 Swayamvaram (1982)
 Yuvaraju (1982)
 Bahudoorapu Batasari (1983)
 M.L.A. Yedukondalu (1983)
 Police Venkataswami (1983)
 Oorantaa Sankranti (1983)
 Jagan (1984)
 Police Papanna (1984)
 Lanchavataram (1985)
 Aatma Bandhuvulu (1987)
 Rotation Chakravarti (1987)
 Intinti Bhagavatam (1988)
 Naa Mogudu Naake Sontam (1989)
 Mama Alludu (1990)
 Amma Rajinama (1991)
 Surigaadu (1992)
 Mamagaaru (1991)
 Seetharamaiah Gari Manavaralu (1991)
 Venkanna Babu (1992)
 Raguluthunna Bharatham (1992)
 Pellam Chaatuna Mogudu (1992)
 Parvatalu Panakalu (1992)
 Chinnalludu (1993)
 Mama Kodalu (1993)
 Ladies Special (1993)Mudhal Paadal (1993; Tamil)
 Bangaru Kutumbam (1994)
 Nannagaaru (1994)
 Punya Bhoomi Naa Desam (1994)
 O Tandri O Koduku (1994)
 Kondapalli Rattaiah (1995)
 Maya Bazaar (1995)
 Orey Rickshaw (1995)
 Subhamastu (1995)
 Mayadari Kutumbam (1995)
 Madhya Taragati Mahabharatam (1995)
 Premaku Padi Sutralu (1995)
 Rayudugaru Nayudugaru (1996)
 Osey Ramulamma (1997)
 Hitler (1997)
 Rukmini (1997)
 Deergha Sumangalibhava (1998)
 Greeku Veerudu (1998)
 Subba Rajugaari Kutumbam (1998)
 Pichchodi Chetilo Raayi (1999)
 Kante Koothurne Kanu (2000)
 Sammakka Sarakka (2000)
 Chinna (2001)
 Adhipathi (2001)
 Kondaveeti Simhasanam (2002)
 Fools (2003)
 Mestri (2009)
 Young India (2010)
 Jhummandi Naadam (2010)
 Pandavulu Pandavulu Tummeda (2014)
 Erra Bus (2014)

Writer only
 Mohammed-bin-Tughluq (1972)
 Hantakulu Devantakulu (1972)
 Matrimoorti (1972)
 Panjaramlo Pasipapa (1973)
 Kudi Edama Ayite (1979)
 Bangaaru Koduku (1982)
 Nampally Nagu (1986)
 Rotation Chakravarti (1987)
 Aadivaram Aadavallaku Selavu (2007)
 Maisamma IPS (2007)
 Adi Vishnu (2008)
 Mestri (2009)
 Bangaru Babu (2009)

Producer
Films

 Sivaranjani (1978)
 Sujata (1980)
 Jayasudha (1982)
 Meghasandesam (1982)
 Bahudoorapu Batasari (1983)
 Justice Chakravarthy (1984)
 Pelli Neeku Akshintalu Naaku (1985)
 Ugra Narasimham (1986)
 Majnu (1987)
 Rotation Chakravarti (1987)
 Ayyappa Swami Janma Rahasyam (1987)
 Intinti Bhagavatam (1988)
 Mama Alludu (1990)
 Orey Rickshaw (1995)
 Rayudugaru Nayudugaru (1996)
 Rowdy Durbar (1997)
 Osey Ramulamma (1997)
 Greeku Veerudu (1998)
 Kante Koothurne Kanu (2000)
 Sammakka Sarakka (2000)
 Chinna (2001)
 Kondaveeti Simhasanam (2002)
 Rifles (2002)
 Bangaru Babu (2009)

TV series
 Abhishekam (ETV)
 Gokulamlo Sita (ETV)

Choreographer
 Young India (2010)

Lyricist

   Oke Kutumbam (1970)
 Manushulanta Okkate (1976)
 Buchchi Babu (1980)
 Sita Ramulu (1980)
 Viswaroopam (1981)
 Swapna (1981)
 Swayamvaram (1982)
 Yuvaraju (1982)
 Ramudu Kadu Krishnudu (1983)
 Yuddham (1984)
 Ugra Narasimham (1986)
 Manavudu Danavudu (1986)
 Majnu (1987)
 Brahma Puthrudu (1988)
 Lankeswarudu (1989)
 Surigaadu (1992)
 Greeku Veerudu (1998)
 Kante Koothurne Kanu (2000)
 Sammakka Sarakka (2000)
 Maisamma IPS'' (2007)

Associate director
  Oke Kutumbam (1970)
  Vintha Samsaram (1971)

References

External links
Official Website

1942 births
2017 deaths
Male actors in Telugu cinema
Indian male film actors
Telugu film directors
Hindi-language film directors
Tamil film directors
Kannada film directors
Telugu screenwriters
Telugu-language lyricists
Hindi-language lyricists
Indian male songwriters
Telugu film producers
Indian film choreographers
Rajya Sabha members from Andhra Pradesh
Union ministers of state of India
Indian actor-politicians
Telugu politicians
Filmfare Awards South winners
Nandi Award winners
Indian National Congress politicians from Andhra Pradesh
People from West Godavari district
20th-century Indian film directors
21st-century Indian film directors
Coal block allocation scam
Male actors from Andhra Pradesh
20th-century Indian musicians
21st-century Indian musicians
Musicians from Andhra Pradesh
Film producers from Andhra Pradesh
Dancers from Andhra Pradesh
20th-century Indian male actors
21st-century Indian male actors
20th-century Indian dramatists and playwrights
21st-century Indian dramatists and playwrights
Screenwriters from Andhra Pradesh
People from Palakollu
Special Mention (feature film) National Film Award winners
20th-century male musicians
21st-century male musicians
People charged with corruption